The Masonic Temple was located at the northwest corner of Peachtree Street and Cain Street (now Andrew Young International Blvd.) in Downtown Atlanta from 1909-1950. The architect was John Robert Dillon.

History 
The building was dedicated on February 22, 1909. On September 7, 1950, a fire gutted the  building. It was replaced by a parking structure which still stands today.

References

Former Masonic buildings in Georgia (U.S. state)
Demolished buildings and structures in Atlanta
John Robert Dillon buildings
Buildings and structures completed in 1909
Buildings and structures demolished in 1950
Burned buildings and structures in the United States